Lucjan Sosnowski (6 January 1934 – 4 September 1999) was a Polish wrestler. He competed at the 1960 Summer Olympics and the 1964 Summer Olympics.

References

1934 births
1999 deaths
Polish male sport wrestlers
Olympic wrestlers of Poland
Wrestlers at the 1960 Summer Olympics
Wrestlers at the 1964 Summer Olympics
People from Lublin County
People from Lublin Voivodeship (1919–1939)
Sportspeople from Lublin Voivodeship